Howard Fields (born March 15, 1958 in Chickasha, Oklahoma) is a former Gridiron football player in the Canadian Football League for nine years. Fields played cornerback for the Hamilton Tiger-Cats and the Calgary Stampeders from 1981-1989. He was a CFL All-Star in 1985 and 1988,  and also won the Grey Cup with the Tiger-Cats in 1986.  He played college football at Baylor University. He was drafted by the Philadelphia Eagles in the twelfth round of the 1980 NFL Draft.

References

1958 births
Living people
People from Chickasha, Oklahoma
American football cornerbacks
Baylor Bears football players
American players of Canadian football
Canadian football defensive backs
Hamilton Tiger-Cats players
Calgary Stampeders players
Players of American football from Oklahoma